The Deepside Deejays are a Romanian band formed in 2008 by vocalist Victor de la Pena, DJ Nick Kamarera, MC Vibearena and keyboardist Dave Pryce. The current lineup consists of Victor de la Pena and Dave Pryce.

Recordings and accolades
In 2009 the Deejays won the Best DJ Award at MTV Romania Music Awards, as well as nominations for Best Dance and Best New Act.  In 2010 they won The Best Featuring Award. The Deejays also won Best Dance Project at Nights.ro Awards.

In 2009, the Deejays released the song "Never Be Alone", which quickly became a radio success in Romania and Russia.

Members
Current members
Nadir Tamuz - vocalist (2018–)
Dave Pryce (Silviu Paduraru) - DJ, keyboardist, producer (2008–)
Victor de la Pena - vocalist (2008–)
Past members
Nick Kamarera - DJ (2008–2009)
Vibearena - MC (2008–2014)

Productions

Deepside Deejays
2011: Never be alone
2012: Stay with me tonight
2013: Look into my eyes
2013: Million miles away (feat. Dollarman)
2013: The road back home (feat. Viky Red)
2014: Wild Child
2014: In my heart
2014: Highways
2015: Forever 23
2016: Deepside Deejays & D. Damsa - Sing It Back
2016: Deepside Deejays & Dael Damsa - Maybe Tonight 
2018: Faydee - More ( Deepside Deejays & BlackJack Official Remix)
2018: Deepside Deejays - Tu M'as Promis
2019: Deepside Deejays - Maya

Other productions
2015
LALLA - Season of love
Voltaj - De la capăt (All Over Again) - Eurovision Song Contest 2015
Yamira feat. Mattyas - Waterfalls (Deepside Deejays Remix)

2013
Dragos Chircu - Catch my love 
Andreea D - It's your birthday

2012
Fly Project - Musica (Deepside Deejays Remix)
Mari Ferrari feat. Deepside Deejays - We are young

2011 
Vanity – Gypsy Moves
Amsterdam Avenue – Sick in Love
Amsterdam Avenue – Far Away
Mattyas – Missing You
Mattyas - Secret Love
Damon – Time Is Running
Caytlin – Una Noche Mas
Shahzoda – Afgana
Kamelia - Dreamin' (Deepside Deejays Remix)
Voxis - Tell me everything (Deepside Deejays Remix)

2010 
Amsterdam Avenue – Mysterious Girl
Mojito Feat. 740 Boyz – Shimmy Shake (Deepside Deejays Remix)
Speak One – Saxoclub
Mattyas – Secret Love
Dina Gabri – Naughty Boy
Neylini – Share My Love
Shahzoda – Dark Sea
 
2009 
Amsterdam Avenue feat. Dj Jungle – Destination Unknown
Vali Bărbulescu feat. Damon – Inside of You

2008 
Nick Kamarera & Deepside Deejays - Beautiful days
Geo Da Silva – I'll Do You Like A Truck
Amsterdam Avenue – Blow It Up

Remixes
2010  
Fly Project – Mandala (Deepside Deejays Remix)
DJ Sava & Raluka – I Like The Trumpet (Deepside Deejays Remix)
Alex – Don't Say It's Over (Deepside Deejays Remix)
Radio Killer – Be Free
Vali Bărbulescu – Addicted 2010
Alex Sayz – United As One
Andreea Bănică – Samba (Deepside Deejays Remix)
Jus Jack – That Sound (Deepside Deejays Remix)

2009 
Martin Solveig – One.2.3 Four (Deepside Deejays Remix)
Ian Carey – Get Shaky (Deepside Deejays Remix)
Dirty South – Minority (Deepside Deejays Remix)
John Dahlback – Everywhere (Deepside Deejays Remix)
Robbie Williams – Feel (Deepside Deejays Remix)
Mike Oldfield – Tubular Bells (Deepside Deejays Remix)
Housequake & Anita Kelsey – Shed My Skin (Deepside Deejays Remix)
Thomas Gold – Just Because (Deepside Deejays Remix)
The Good Guys – Circle (Deepside Deejays Remix)
Fly Project – Alegria 
Danny Merx Feat. Majuri – Sunshine (Deepside Deejays Remix)
Idriss Chebak & SKJG Project – Capanema (Deepside Deejays Remix)
Soul Avengerz – Heard It All Before (Deepside Deejays Remix)
Jay C Feat. Nathan Thomas – Multiply (Deepside Deejays Remix)
Sonichouse – Beautiful World (Deepside Deejays Remix)
Cream Feat. Fatman Scoop – Just A Lil Bit (Deepside Deejays Remix)
Biank – Flashing Lights (Deepside Deejays Remix)
Lili Sandu – Lee Lee (Deepside Deejays Remix)
Fly Project - Raisa (Deepside Deejays Remix)
Dj Rynno & Silvia - Huska (Deepside Deejays Remix)

2008 
David Deejay Feat. Dony – Sexy Thing (Deepside Deejays Remix)
DJ Sava & Raluka – Sweet love (Deepside Deejays Remix)
Aisa & DJ Yaang – Ready To Go (Deepside Deejays Remix)
Activ feat. Dj Optick - Be free (Deepside Deejays Remix)

References

External links
 Official website
 SoundCloud
 Beatport

Romanian electronic music groups
Musical groups from Bucharest